King's Highway 17, more commonly known as Highway 17, is a provincially maintained highway and the primary route of the Trans-Canada Highway through the Canadian province of Ontario. A small disconnected signed section of the highway still remains within the Ottawa Region between County Road 29 and Grants Side Road. This makes it Ontario's longest highway.

However, a section of Highway 17 "disappeared" when the Ottawa section of it was upgraded to the freeway Highway 417 in 1971. Highway 17 was not re-routed through Ottawa, nor did it share numbering with Highway 417 to rectify the discontinuity, even though Highway 417 formed a direct link between the western and eastern sections of Highway 17. However, from East Hawkesbury to Ottawa, Highway 17 retained the Trans-Canada Highway routing and signs until it met up again and merged with Highway 417 until 1997 when Highway 17 through Ottawa was downgraded. The Trans-Canada Highway designation now extends along all of Highway 417.

Ontario Highway 17 is a very important part of the national highway system in Canada, as it is the sole highway linking the eastern and western regions of the country. Although other small roads connect the province of Ontario with the province of Manitoba, it is the only major highway that links the two, making it a crucial section of Canada's primary commercial and leisure route for all traffic travelling between Canada's largest cities, from Toronto and Montreal in the east to Calgary and Vancouver in the west.

History

Beginnings 
With the establishment of the provincial highway network on February 26, 1920, the Department of Public Highways, predecessor to today's Ministry of Transportation of Ontario, sought to establish a network of reliable roads through the southern part of the province. Through July and August 1920, a highway east of Ottawa to Pointe-Fortune at the Quebec boundary, known as the Montreal Road, was assumed by the department.
A portion of this original highway was lost when the completion of the Carillon Generating Station in 1964 raised the water level of the Ottawa River north of Voyageur Provincial Park.

West of Ottawa, a route was assumed to Arnprior on October 6, following today's Carling Avenue, March Road and Donald B. Munro Drive between Ottawa and Kinburn, and Kinburn Side Road and Madawaska Boulevard between Kinburn and Arnprior.  On June 15, 1921, the highway was extended to Pembroke via Renfrew, Cobden, and Beachburg. The entire route between Pembroke and Pointe-Fortune became known as Highway 17 in the summer of 1925.

Although the jurisdiction of the soon-to-become Department of Highways did not extend beyond Pembroke, a rough trail continued to North Bay, and a trunk road constructed by the Department of Northern Development beyond there to Sault Ste. Marie by 1923, roughly following the route of Highway 17 today.
The Pembroke and Mattawan Road Colonization Road was constructed between 1853 and 1874 to encourage settlement in the Upper Ottawa Valley. Between Mattawa and North Bay, many aboriginals and early settlers made use of the Mattawa River, the headwaters of which lie just north of Lake Nipissing. From there they would travel down the French River into Georgian Bay and onwards to Lake Superior. Highway 17 between Mattawa and Sault Ste. Marie roughly traces this early voyageur route.

Northern development and the Lakehead 
Following World War I, discussions of a cross-continental road through Canada became vocal and construction of such a route was underway in several places. However, funding for this work was soon halted as the government distributed funding to projects that were believed to be more important than the luxury of the new road. The most significant accomplishment of this work was the Nipigon Highway between Thunder Bay and Nipigon, opened in 1924.

With the signing of the Department of Northern Development (DND) Act in 1926, construction resumed on improving many northern roads; the Ferguson Highway was the main project to begin as a result of the act. The onset of the Great Depression would result in federally funded relief projects being signed with provinces in late 1930.
Thousands of men were hired to construct highways in remote areas of the province from temporary camps, named Bennett Camps after then-Prime Minister R. B. Bennett. This provided the necessary labour to open road links through vast expanses of wilderness in a relatively short period of time. Beginning in 1931, certain routes were designated as the Trans-Canada Highway, including the route between Sault Ste. Marie and the Quebec boundary as well as the planned connection to Thunder Bay and Winnipeg.

By June 1931, planning for the route of the highway was complete,
and work underway on the new link between Thunder Bay and Winnipeg that would roughly parallel the Canadian Pacific Railway. The first section to open was between the Manitoba town of Whitemouth and Kenora. On Dominion Day (July 1) 1932, an inter-provincial ceremony was held in Kenora to dedicate the new route.
The next link would connect the road through the Kenora with the rough road connecting Vermilion Bay, Dryden and Dyment. This section opened in early 1933.

From the east, construction proceeded at a similar pace, although through much more barren expanses of forests and lakes. By the end of 1932, construction had proceeded from Thunder Bay through Upsala to English River. A  gap was all that remained, between Dyment and English River.
On June 4, 1934, crews cleared the last section of forest separating Thunder Bay from Winnipeg.
However, it would require another year of rock blasting and construction to make the route navigable by vehicles. On July 1, 1935, a multi-day motorcade celebration was held to officially open the new highway. A convoy of vehicles travelled from Thunder Bay to Winnipeg along the route, resting overnight in Kenora before completing the two-day journey.

By the end of 1935, numerous factors combined which resulted in the termination of the highway camps. The federal government of R. B. Bennett used Section 98 of the Criminal Code in 1931 to arrest several leaders of the Communist Party of Canada. However, the lack of evidence and protests would eventually lead to the early release of the men, much to the embarrassment of the government.
The men, with public support behind them, headed north to highway camps, where mounting tensions due to low wages, poor conditions, lacklustre food, isolation, and military-like discipline resulted in organized labour strikes. Funding was pulled from the Trans-Canada Highway in 1936.

On April 1, 1937, the DND was absorbed into the Department of Highways, and the road west of Pembroke became an extension of Highway 17. At this point, the highway from Sault Ste. Portions were paved at this point: east of Sault Ste. Marie, west of Blind River, through Sudbury, east of Sturgeon Falls, through Mattawa, and from Chalk River to Quebec; the remainder was a gravel road. The only significant exceptions were in the Kenora and Thunder Bay areas.

Before the outbreak of World War II in 1939, a new bridge spanning the Nipigon River was completed alongside a  highway eastward to Schreiber. Both were opened together ceremoniously on September 24, 1937.
When the war began, construction on Highway 17 halted, with effort instead focused on the simpler northern route via Geraldton and Hearst.

The Gap 
Following the war, construction on the missing segment of Highway 17 between Schreiber and Sault Ste. Marie proceeded slowly; the completion of Highway 11 between Nipigon and Hearst already provided a road between the east and west. However, in 1949 the federal government signed the Trans-Canada Highway Act, which provided up to a 90% subsidy to provinces to complete their portion of the highway to the required standards. Two portions of Ontario's route were eligible for this subsidy: Highway 69 between Parry Sound and Sudbury, and Highway 17 along the north shore of Lake Superior.

The Gap was completed and opened to traffic on September 17, 1960, uniting the two segments and completing the route of Highway 17 from the Manitoba border to the Quebec border.

The Queensway 

During the 1950s, the Greber Plan called for the creation of numerous parkways and divided highways through the growing city of Ottawa. One of these, known as The Queensway, was a grade-separated freeway that would bypass the urban alignment of Highway 17. The Greber Plan was produced by Jacques Gréber under the direction of Prime Minister William Lyon Mackenzie King in the late 1940s. Although Gréber had been corresponding with King as early as 1936, World War II halted any plans from reaching fruition at that time. Following the war, Gréber was again contacted and his expertise requested. He arrived on October 2, 1945, and began working almost immediately.
The Greber Plan, as it came to be known, was released in 1950 and presented to the House of Commons on May 22, 1951.
The plan called for the complete reorganization of Ottawa's road and rail network, and included amongst the numerous parkways was an east to west expressway along what was then a Canadian National Railway line.

With the rail lines removed, construction of the new expressway got underway in 1957 when Queen Elizabeth visited Ottawa to open the first session of the 23rd Parliament. On October 15, the Queen detonated dynamite charges from the Hurdman Bridge, which now overlooks the highway as it crosses the Rideau River, and formally dedicated the new project as the Queensway. At the ceremony, premier Leslie Frost indicated that the entire project would cost C$31 million and emphasized the importance of the link to the Trans-Canada Highway.

The Queensway was constructed in four phases, each opening independently: phase one, from Alta Vista Drive (now Riverside Drive) east to Highway 17 (Montreal Road); phase two, from Highway 7 and Highway 15 (Richmond Road) to Carling Avenue; phase three, from Carling Avenue to O'Connor Street; and, phase four, from O'Connor Street to Alta Vista Drive, crossing the Rideau Canal and Rideau River.
Phase one opened to traffic on November 25, 1960, extending up to the Rideau River.
On the western side of Ottawa, phase two opened a year later in October 1961. The central section presented the greatest challenge, as an embankment was built to create grade-separations. In addition, the structures over the Rideau Canal and river required several years of construction. On May 15, 1964, the majority of the third phase was ceremonially opened.
completing the Carling Avenue interchange and extending the freeway as far as Bronson Avenue.
Several months later, on September 17 the short but complicated section east to O'Connor Street was opened.
This left only phase four, the central section of the Queensway, which was opened in three segments. On November 26, 1965, the structures over the Rideau Canal were opened to traffic. At the same time, the westbound lanes of the Queensway were extended to Concord Street, located west of the Nicholas Street interchange.
The interchange opened on January 1, 1966, allowing travel in both directions over the canal.
The final segment, linking the two section of the Queensway, was placed into service on October 28, 1966.
Following this, the Highway 17 designation was applied along the Queensway and the old routing renumbered as Highway 17B.

Bypasses and upgrades 
Although it was completed from Manitoba to Quebec in 1960, many upgrades to the original routing of Highway 17 had and would take place over the years. In addition to bypasses around almost every urban centre it encountered, many original sections have been downloaded to regional and local jurisdiction or decommissioned entirely to lie abandoned in the forest. Of special note are reroutings in the Ottawa Valley – where the highway follows very little of the original routing – and around Thunder Bay, where it has undergone several reroutings and upgrades since the 1920s. In the following section, upgrades are listed from west to east due to complex chronologies.

Thunder Bay
The original routing of Highway 17 travelled into Port Arthur along the Dawson Road, now Highway 102.

Nipigon
Highway 17 originally entered Red Rock along what is now Highway 628 before turning north alongside the Nipigon River north to Nipigon.

Sault Ste. Marie
Although the route into and out of Sault Ste. Marie has remained generally the same, Highway 17 has been rerouted through the city numerous times. In addition, to the east of the city, the route has been redirected onto a four lane at-grade expressway around Echo Bay. As recently as 2022, local government has reached out to the provincial government to revisit possibilities of creating a much needed bypass around Sault Ste. Marie—however this plan has long been stalled by the MTO and provincial government, largely due to the high cost of construction and uncertain demand; there has also been no environmental impact assessment to date.

Espanola

Sudbury
The route of Highway 17 in Sudbury currently follows the Southwest and Southeast Bypasses through the south end of the city. Prior to the completion of this route, the highway followed what is now Municipal Road 55 through the downtown core.

North Bay

Upper Ottawa Valley
Construction of the Renfrew Bypass began in June 1974,
and continued for three years, opening in 1977.

Ottawa

Lower Ottawa Valley

Elsewhere
The last gravel stretches of Highway 17, between Kenora and Dryden and north of Batchawana Bay, were paved in 1964.

Downloads 
On April 1, 1997, the Ministry of Transportation of Ontario (MTO) transferred the responsibility of maintenance and upkeep along  of Highway 17 east of "the split" with Highway 417 to Trim Road (Regional Road 57), a process commonly referred to as downloading. The Region of Ottawa–Carleton designated the road as Regional Road 174. Despite the protests of the region that the route served a provincial purpose, a second round of transfers saw the remainder of Highway 17 to the Region's eastern limit downloaded on January 1, 1998, adding  to the length of Regional Road 174.
The highway was also downloaded within the United Counties of Prescott and Russell, where it was redesignated as County Road 17.
The result of these transfers was the truncation of Highway 17 at the western end of Highway 417, while the Trans-Canada Highway designation was taken from the former Highway 17 and applied to Highway 417.
A short disconnected section of Highway 17 between Ottawa Road 29 and Grants Side Road remains under provincial jurisdiction to the present day.

Since 2000 
417 extensions / shortening of Highway 17

Route description 
Highway 17, particularly west of Sault Ste. Marie, crosses some of the most remote regions of Ontario. Despite the isolation of the highway, it is well-travelled throughout its length. The section of Highway 17 north of Lake Superior is regarded as one of the most scenic drives in the province.

Manitoba to Nipigon 
Highway 17 begins at the boundary between Ontario and Manitoba, where a large installation greets drivers in both directions. The highway is two lanes wide and travels over and between the surface features of the Canadian Shield; further west into Manitoba the highway widens into a four-lane divided expressway. To the east, the highway travels through thick boreal forest towards Keewatin, where the Kenora Bypass, Highway 17A, splits to the north. Through the town of Kenora, Highway 17 is signed but maintained under a connecting link agreement between the town and the province. Full provincial maintenance resumes at the eastern town limits. Further east, the highway merges with the Kenora Bypass. It meets the northern terminus of Highway 71, then makes a gradual eastward journey through the lake-dotted Kenora District to the town of Dryden. Here the highway encounters one of the few agriculturally-sustainable areas of northern Ontario. The highway begins to zig-zag southeasterly, passing through several minor settlements before entering the mining town of Ignace. Shortly thereafter, it begins to curve to the south.

The two highways travel concurrently towards Thunder Bay at the western Lakehead of Lake Superior. Though it originally travelled through what was then the twin-cities, the highway bypasses to the northwest on the at-grade Thunder Bay Expressway.

Nipigon to Sudbury 
Within Nipigon, Highway 11 and Highway 17 cross the Nipigon River on the Nipigon River Bridge. Along with the railway crossing immediately to the south, and another on the northern shore of Lake Nipigon, this forms the narrowest bottleneck in Canada between the Atlantic and Pacific oceans. On the eastern shore of the river, Highway 11 separates and travels north towards Geraldton and Hearst. Highway 17 continues east along the northern shore of Lake Superior. Near White River, the highway enters Algoma District and turns southward. It meets the western terminus of Highway 101 near Wawa, which provides for a shorter route to Sudbury via the Sultan Industrial Road.

South of Wawa, the highway enters Lake Superior Provincial Park. After proceeding through several mountain ranges, and crossing numerous rivers and the Montreal River Hill, the highway enters Sault Ste. Marie. Here a border crossing into the United States is provided via the Sault Ste. Marie International Bridge, which connects with I-75 in Michigan. As the highway exits Sault Ste. Marie to the east, a newly constructed segment of four-lane divided highway branches north; Highway 17B (one of two remaining business routes of Highway 17 in service) continues east through Garden River. The divided highway bypasses Garden River and passes east of Echo Bay before curving south and merging with Highway 17B.

Shortly thereafter, it turns to the east and travels along the North Channel of Lake Huron towards Sudbury, passing through numerous small towns, including Thessalon, Blind River, Massey and McKerrow. At Sudbury, the highway widens into a freeway through the Walden area of the city until reaching the Southwest / Southeast Bypass at Lively, where it narrows again to a Super 2 road. This segment is currently undergoing an environmental assessment, with plans to upgrade it to a full freeway in the next ten years.

Sudbury to Arnprior 

Highway 17 passes to the south of the urban centre of Sudbury. It meets Highway 69 at an interchange. At this interchange, the Southwest and Southeast Bypasses meet, and for just over a kilometre, Highway 17 is a divided four-lane freeway.

The Super 2 continues northeast to meet the original alignment of Highway 17 east of downtown Sudbury. Here it turns east and travels through the city's outlying neighbourhoods of Coniston and Wahnapitae; a new freeway alignment of this route is currently in the planning stages.

The highway route passes through the rural municipalities of Markstay-Warren and West Nipissing before reaching North Bay, where it follows an undivided four-lane expressway alignment, with reduced but not full control of access, through the city of North Bay; as of 2012, early preparations have taken place for a freeway conversion and realignment of this segment. For 4.1 kilometres from Algonquin Avenue to the Twin Lakes area, the route is once again concurrent with Highway 11. At the northern end of this concurrency, Highway 11 travels north towards Cochrane before continuing westward to Nipigon; at the southern end, it continues southward towards Toronto, while Highway 17 turns east toward the Ottawa Valley. An at-grade intersection with Highway 63 is located at approximately the midpoint of the concurrency.

East of North Bay, Highway 17 meets Highway 94, thereafter travelling alongside the Mattawa River to its confluence with the Ottawa River in Mattawa, where it meets Highway 533 at a roundabout. The highway then parallels the Ottawa River through a mountainous region, first passing through the villages of Stonecliffe and Rolphton before arriving in Deep River, a planned community developed as part of the Manhattan Project. It then passes through Chalk River and enters Canadian Forces Base Petawawa.

Beginning at the southern end of the army base, Highway 17 follows the Pembroke Bypass, bypassing west of Petawawa and Pembroke, where it intersects Highway 41. The bypass ends at Renfrew County Road 40, north of Muskrat Lake. The highway then travels south through the town of Cobden. It follows a bypass east of Renfrew and meets Highway 60. Highway 17 curves east and passes north of Alexander Stewart Provincial Park. A disconnected section of Highway 17 still exists within the City of Ottawa, between Ottawa Road 29 and Grants Side Road, travelling parallel to Highway 417. However, it is likely to be downgraded, becoming an extension of Ottawa Road 117.

Business routes 
Highway 17 used to have a number of business routes, all but one of which have been decommissioned. All were at one time the primary route of Highway 17 through their respective locations, and were given the business route designation following the construction or designation of a newer bypass alignment.

Highway 17B (Ottawa)
Highway 17B (North Bay)
Highway 17B (Thessalon)
Highway 17B (Sault Ste. Marie)
Highway 17B (Thunder Bay)

Future 

With all route planning studies now completed on Highways 11 and 69/400, in the latter half of the 2000s, the Ministry of Transportation's planning branch began undertaking more active preparations for the eventual conversion of Highway 17 to freeway. Although no comprehensive conversion plan is currently in place, planning and construction projects are now underway at a number of locations along the highway.

Sault Ste. Marie MPP David Orazietti has spearheaded a petition to have the entire highway four-laned from Arnprior to Sault Ste. Marie, similar to the campaign previously undertaken by his caucus colleague Rick Bartolucci regarding the extension of Highway 400. Cheryl Gallant, the federal Member of Parliament for Renfrew—Nipissing—Pembroke, has also advocated the four-laning of the highway through the Ottawa Valley toward North Bay, and ultimately the entire length of the highway throughout Northern Ontario.

A 2009 study commissioned by the forestry trade magazine The Working Forest, titled "A Vision for Ontario's Trans Canada Highway, North Bay to the Manitoba Border", determined that it would cost the Ontario government $600 million per year over 25 years to convert the entire length of both Highway 17 and Highway 11 to freeway, suggesting that a comprehensive plan would be affordable and achievable if the provincial and federal governments could reach a cost-sharing agreement.

Renfrew County 

Studies are underway on the extension of Highway 417 through the Ottawa Valley region from its current terminus at Arnprior to Petawawa. From Arnprior to Haley Station and from Meath to Petawawa, the proposed freeway route largely follows the existing alignment — in these areas, the current highway route largely avoids existing communities, and thus a second set of lanes can be easily added alongside the existing route. Within the township of Whitewater Region, however, a new alignment is planned several kilometres east of the existing road in order to bypass communities such as Cobden.

In August 2017, the Ministry of Transportation formally confirmed that detail design studies have commenced on the next westward extension of Highway 417, from the existing terminus at Scheel Drive in Arnprior to three kilometres west of the Bruce Street intersection at Renfrew.

North Bay 
Planning studies have been completed for the conversion of Highway 17's alignment through North Bay, which is currently a four-lane expressway with partial but not full control of access, into a full freeway. The plan will include an interchange with a new alignment of Highway 11, which would replace the existing Algonquin Avenue segment. In the city, the four-laned route will follow the existing highway route from the western city limits to Meighen Avenue, and then a new alignment from there to the eastbound Highway 11/17 interchange. The bypassed portion of the current route will be realigned to connect with Lansdowne Avenue. This alignment, nicknamed "Route 6", has been planned since the 1970s; although minor adjustments to the plan have been made since, as of 2017 the ministry has not announced an official construction schedule.

Studies commenced on an extension of the four-lane route easterly to Bonfield in early 2011, and from Eau Claire Station to the Nipissing District-Renfrew County boundary in early 2012; further studies on the routes from Bonfield to Eau Claire Station and from North Bay to Cache Bay are expected to begin at a later date.

Sudbury 
As the extension of Highway 400 approaches Sudbury, the MTO began a route planning and environmental assessment study on Highway 17 easterly from Highway 69 to Markstay in 2010; studies for the segment from Highway 69 westerly to the existing freeway in Walden were completed in 2007. The current route plan involves twinning the existing Southeast Bypass to its terminus, along with the construction of a new four-lane route north of Coniston and Wahnapitae. 

Original plans called for a new multi-level interchange with Highway 69 in the Lake Laurentian Conservation Area.
However, public consultation has since removed this proposal from the route planning process; all of the plans currently under consideration involve converting the existing alignment of Highway 69 to a full freeway which would meet Highway 17 at the existing interchange.

Preliminary route planning studies have also been completed on the freeway's westerly extension to McKerrow, near Espanola, but no construction schedule has been announced to date. However, the first phase of this route, extending the existing freeway from Municipal Road 55 in Sudbury for six kilometres farther west through the Den-Lou neighbourhood, is currently in the detail design phase.

Sault Ste. Marie 
At Sault Ste. Marie, the expressway segment currently ends six kilometres short of its eventual terminus at Black Road and Second Line, as an agreement has yet to be reached with the Batchawana First Nation regarding land use through Rankin. The completion date for this segment is not currently known. In the interim, highway traffic travels between the expressway and the current highway alignment through Sault Ste. Marie by means of the previously planned northerly extension of Trunk Road.

The former segment of Highway 17 through Garden River was initially redesignated as part of Highway 638, although the Garden River First Nation disputed this designation and insisted that the highway be renamed Highway 17B. As of February 2009, the former route is now designated as Highway 17B. In February 2010, Garden River's band council publicly warned that they would consider imposing tolls on the routes of both Highway 17 and Highway 17B through their territory if the provincial government did not assist the council with a funding shortfall of approximately $1 million.

In February 2011, the Ministry of Transportation announced that the expressway's current level intersection at Highway 638 in Echo Bay will be upgraded to a full interchange.

Thunder Bay and Kenora 

Construction started in 2004 on a westerly extension of Thunder Bay's Harbour Expressway, from the Thunder Bay Expressway to Vibert Road, intended to serve as a new alignment for Highways 11 and 17.

In July 2008 the federal and provincial governments announced a $6.2 billion infrastructure program that makes the four-laning of Hwys. 11 and 17 near Kenora and Thunder Bay a priority. Engineering work on twinning 11/17 between Nipigon and Thunder Bay was to begin in 2008. On May 1, 2009 the federal and provincial government announced that twinning of Highway 11/17 would begin in 2010.
On May 15, 2009, the federal and provincial government announced that twinning of Highway 17 at the Manitoba/Ontario boundary easterly toward Kenora would also begin in 2010. Construction to twin the highway between Ouimet and Dorion northeast of Thunder Bay is currently underway.

On November19, 2021, the first contracts for the twinning of Highway17 east from the Manitoba boundary to Kenora were signed. Work is set to begin in the spring of 2022 on the portion from the provincial boundary to Highway 673.

Major intersections

Notes

References 
Sources

Bibliography

External links 

Trans Canada Highway distance charts, road conditions, maps
Highway 17 photos and information
Google Maps: Highway 17 route

017
Ontario 017
Lake Superior Circle Tour
Roads in Greater Sudbury
Roads in Thunder Bay
Transport in Dryden, Ontario
Transport in Kenora
Transport in North Bay, Ontario
Transport in Sault Ste. Marie, Ontario